Sir Pherozeshah Merwanjee Mehta (4 August 1845 – 5 November 1915) was an Indian politician and lawyer from Bombay. He was knighted by the British Government in India for his service to the law. He became the Municipal commissioner of Bombay Municipality in 1873 and its president four times – 1884, 1885, 1905 and 1911. Mehta was one of the founding members and President of the Indian National Congress in 1890 held at Calcutta.

Early life
Pherozeshah Merwanjee Mehta was born on 4 August, 1845 in Bombay City, Bombay Presidency, British India into a Gujarati-speaking Parsi Zoroastrian family. His father, a Bombay-based businessman who also spent plenty of time in Calcutta, was not highly educated, but he did translate a Chemistry textbook into Gujarati and wrote a Geography textbook. Graduating from the Elphinstone College in 1864, Pherozeshah obtained his Master of Arts degree with honors six months later, becoming the first such Parsi, from the University of Bombay (later re-established as University of Mumbai). Sir Alexander Grant, principal of the university, nominated him a Fellow of the university and tried to procure him a scholarship founded by Jamsetjee Jejeebhoy to study in Europe. However, Mehta did not avail himself of the scholarship.

Mehta went to England from India to study law at Lincoln's Inn in London. Here, he met and began association with fellow Indian barristers Womesh Chunder Bonnerjee and Badruddin Tyabji. In 1868, he became the first Parsi barrister called to the Bar from Lincoln's Inn.  The same year, he returned to India, was admitted to the bar, and soon established a practice for himself in a profession then dominated by British lawyers.

It was during a legal defence of Arthur Crawford that he pointed out the need for reforms in the Bombay municipal government. Later, he drafted the Bombay Municipal Act of 1872 and is thus considered the 'father of Bombay Municipality'. Eventually, Mehta left his law practice to enter politics.

Political and social activities

When the Bombay Presidency Association was established in 1885, Mehta became its president, and remained so for the rest of his years. He encouraged Indians to obtain western education and embrace its culture to uplift India. He contributed to many social causes for education, sanitation and health care in the city and around India.

Mehta was one of the founders of the Indian National Congress. He was the chairman of the Reception Committee in its fifth session in Bombay in 1889. He presided over the next session in Calcutta.

Mehta was nominated to the Bombay Legislative Council in 1887 and in 1893 a member of the Imperial Legislative Council. In 1894, he was appointed a Companion of the Order of the Indian Empire (CIE) and was appointed a Knight Commander (KCIE) in 1904.

In 1910, he started The Bombay Chronicle, an English-language weekly newspaper, which became an important nationalist voice of its time, and an important chronicler of the political upheavals of a volatile pre-independent India. He served as a member of Bombay's Municipal Corporation for six years.

Mehta died on 5 November 1915, in Bombay.

Legacy

A portrait of Pherozeshah Mehta at the Indian Parliament House, shows his importance in the making of the nation. He was known as 'The Lion of Bombay' and 'Uncrowned King of Bombay'. In Mumbai, even today Mehta is much revered; there are roads, halls and law colleges named after him. He is respected as an important inspiration for young Indians of the era, his leadership of India's bar and legal profession, and for laying the foundations of Indian involvement in political activities and inspiring Indians to fight for more self-government.

In Mehta's lifetime, few Indians had discussed or embraced the idea of full political independence from Britain. As one of the few people who espoused involvement of the activity of Indians in politics, he was nicknamed "Ferocious Mehta."

See also
 Indian Independence Movement
 Indian National Congress

Bibliography
 Sir Pherozeshah Mehta, a Political Biography – Homi Mody. New York, Asia Pub. House, 1963.
 Sir Pherozeshah Mehta – Hormasji Peroshaw Mody. New Delhi, Publications Division, Ministry of Information and Broadcasting (1967, 1963)
 Life and times of Sir Pherozeshah Mehta – V S Srinivasa Sastri, Bharatiya Vidya Bhavan, 1975.
 Pherozeshah Mehta : Socio-political ideology – S R Bakshi. New Delhi, Anmol Publications, 1991.
 Sir Pherozeshah Mehta memorial volume – Godrej N Dotivala. Bombay : Mayor's Fund Committee, 1990.
 Pherozeshah Mehta : maker of modern India -Nawaz B Mody. Allied Publishers, 1997.
 Sir Pherozeshah Mehta, a sketch of his life and career. (Spanish) Madras, G.A. Natesan 1916.
 Some unpublished & later speeches & writings of Sir Pherozeshah Mehta – POO. Jeejeebhoy. Commercial Press, 1918.
 Ten Indian Biographies, in Hindi – Surendra Sharma; Avadha Upadhyaya; Lakshminidhi Chaturvedi; P S Verma; P N Ojha; Janakosharan Verma; Ganesha Datta Gaur. Prayaga, Hindi Press, 1930.

References

External links

 Postage Stamp of Pherozeshah Mehta, 1996
 Pherozeshah Mehta Biography in Hindi
 Pherozeshah Mehta in Hindi

1845 births
1915 deaths
Parsi people
Parsi people from Mumbai
Politicians from Mumbai
Presidents of the Indian National Congress
Indian independence activists from Maharashtra
University of Mumbai alumni
Knights Commander of the Order of the Indian Empire
Indian knights
Members of the Imperial Legislative Council of India
Elphinstone College alumni
Businesspeople from Mumbai
Indian newspaper founders
Indian National Congress politicians from Maharashtra
Members of the Bombay Legislative Council
Scholars from Mumbai
19th-century Indian lawyers
20th-century Indian lawyers
19th-century Indian politicians
20th-century Indian politicians